The 1898 Currie Cup was the fifth edition of the Currie Cup, the premier annual domestic rugby union competition in South Africa.

See also

 Currie Cup

References

1898
1898 in South African rugby union
Currie